The Neu-Ulm Challenger (1982-1992) respectively Ulm Challenger (1993-2002) was a professional tennis tournament in Germany played on clay courts that was part of the ATP Challenger Series. It was held annually in Neu-Ulm, Bavaria and later in Ulm, Baden Württemberg from 1982 to 2002.

Past finals

Singles

Doubles

References
Official website of the International Tennis Federation

ATP Challenger Tour
Clay court tennis tournaments
Sports competitions in Bavaria
Tennis tournaments in Germany